The U.S. Women's Indoor Championships, was a national tennis championship for women that was sanctioned by the United States Tennis Association and held 79 times from 1907 through 2001 at various locations and on various surfaces.  The event was affiliated with the WTA Tour from 1971 through 2001 (excluding 1977).

Marie Wagner won more singles titles (6) and Hazel Hotchkiss Wightman won more doubles titles (10) at this tournament than any other woman.  Lois Felix holds the record for runners-up in singles (4) while Wightman and Norma Taubele Barber hold the record for runners-up in doubles (5).

The women's tournament started in 1907 when they joined the men at the Seventh Regiment Armory in New York to form a combined tournament. Elisabeth Moore won the first title. The women's doubles event was added in 1908. The women played periods in New York (1907–1920, 1934–1940, and 1947–1953) and Longwood Courts at Chestnut Hill (1921–1933, 1941–1946, 1954–1966). From 1967 to 1972 the women played in Winchester. In 2002 the women rejoined the men in Memphis and in 2012 Memphis announced that it was renaming (restoring) the tournament to U.S. National Indoor Tennis Championships.

In 2002, a women's WTA Tour event in Oklahoma City was purchased and moved to Memphis; this event was renamed The Cellular South Cup. As Cellular South ended sponsoring the tournament after 2011, the event was renamed Memphis International.

Locations
1907–41: New York
1942–1966:Chestnut Hill
1967–71: Winchester
1973: Hingham
1974: New York
1975: Boston
1976: Atlanta
1978-81: Minneapolis
1982: Philadelphia
1983: Hartford, Connecticut
1984: East Hanover, New Jersey
1985-86: Princeton, New Jersey
1987: Piscataway Township, New Jersey
2001: Oklahoma City

Results

Singles

Doubles

See also
 U.S. National Indoor Tennis Championships – men's tournament
 U.S. Women's Clay Court Championships

References

Carpet court tennis tournaments
Indoor tennis tournaments
Defunct tennis tournaments in the United States
WTA Tour
 
2001 disestablishments in Oklahoma